Enrico Hillyer Giglioli (13 June 1845 – 16 December 1909) was an Italian zoologist and anthropologist.

Giglioli was born in London and first studied there. He obtained a degree in science at the University of Pisa in 1864 and started to teach zoology in Florence in 1869. Marine vertebrates, and invertebrates, were his academic interest but he was a noted amateur ornithologist and photographer.

Giglioli was director of the Royal Zoological Museum in Florence, Italy. He wrote up the zoology of the voyage of the corvette  on which he had taken over from Filippo de Filippi. Professor De Filippi died in Hong Kong in 1867. He was also involved in the activities of the Florence School of Anthropology and through this developed an interest in ethnography. In 1901, he was elected as a member of the American Philosophical Society.

Whale sightings
The Rorqual is the only similarly configured whale in the fossil record. A similar whale was seen a year later off the coast of Scotland. The two dorsal fins were said to be over six feet high, with a large pair of flippers. It was provisionally named Anphiptera Pacifica, and is an unrecognized species of, not having been confirmed by enough sightings to be recognized as a species. The voyage of the "Magenta" was sponsored by the Government of Italy in the 19th century.

He also reported a stranding of a Cuvier's beaked whale in the Mediterranean Sea, as well as orcas and fin whales in the Mediterranean.

Other work
Giglioli conducted a detailed study of the chimpanzee skulls which his friend Georg August Schweinfurth collected in the region of today's southern Sudan. He named the species Troglodytes schweinfurthii.

After his death, Giglioli's collection, together with his extensive archaeological and ethnological library (from 1885 Giglioli concentrated on his ethnographic collection exchanging specimens with the Smithsonian Institution and fellow naturalists, notably Edward Pierson Ramsay), went to the Pigorini National Museum of Prehistory and Ethnography where they are now conserved. The photographic archive includes work by John K. Hillers, Timothy H. O'Sullivan and Charles Milton Bell photos as well as his own.

Works
Partial list
 I Tasmaniani. Cenni storici ed etnologici di un popolo estinto. Illustrated with 15 Original Albumen Photographs (the last of the aborigines). Milano: F. Treves.
 Elenco dei Mammiferi, degli Uccelli e dei Rettili ittiofagi appartenenti alla Fauna italiana, e Catalogo degli Anfibie dei Pesci italiani in Catalogo Sezione italiana. Esposizione intern. di Pesca, Berlino, 1880 (11): 63–117. (also sep., Firenze, 1880: pp. 18–55). 1880.
Primo resoconto dei risultati della inchiesta ornitologica in Italia Comp. dal dottore Enrico Hillyer Giglioli Firenze. Coi tipi dei successori Le Monnier 1889–1891.  and (secondo)
with Odoardo Beccari (1843–1920) and Francis Henry Hill Guillemard (1852–1933), Wanderings in the great forests of Borneo; travels and researches of a naturalist in Sarawak London: A. Constable & Co., Ltd.
 Giglioli, E.H. 1882. New and very rare fish from the Mediterranean. Nature 25: 535.
 Giglioli, E.H. 1882. New Deep-sea Fish from the Mediterranean. Nature, London 27 : 198–199.
 Intorno a due nuovi pesci dal golfo di Napoli. Zool. Anz 6 (144). 397–400.
 With A. Issel Esplorazione talassografica del Mediterraneo esguita sotto gli auspici del Governo italia no: 199–291, 5 fig. n.n., I map. 1884.
 Note intorno agli animali vertebrati raccolti dal Conte Augusto Boutourline e dal D. Leopoldo Traversi ad Assab e nello Scioa negli anni 1884-87. Annali Mus. civ. Stor. nat. Genova (2) 6: 5-73. 1888.
 On a supposed new genus and species of pelagic gadoid fishes from the Mediterranean. Proc. Zool. Soc. London (Pt. 3): 328–332. 1889.
 Apunti intorno ad una Collezione Etnografica fatta durante il terzo viaggio di Cook e conservata sin dalla fine del secolo scorso nel R. Museo di Fisica e Storia Naturale di Firenze. Firenze. 1893–95.

See also
:Category:Taxa named by Enrico Hillyer Giglioli

References

Notes

Citations

 Fedora Giordano, 1990 Italy's Contribution to Native American Studies European Review of Native American Studies 4:2
 Maurice Boubier (1925). L’Évolution de l’ornithologie. Librairie Félix Alcan (Paris), coll. Nouvelle collection scientifique : ii + 308 p.
 Barbara Mearns & Richard Mearns (1998). The Bird Collectors. Academic Press (Londres) : xvii + 472 p.

External links
USNM Archive Correspondence from the years 1889-1891 documenting an exchange of Archaeological and Ethnological artifacts between the U. S. N. M. and the Museum of Zoology, Florence, Italy.
Biographie du Musée de la photographie (in Italian)

See also
 European and American voyages of scientific exploration

Italian anthropologists
Italian curators
Italian ornithologists
Italian zoologists
1845 births
1909 deaths